Keikhu (also pronounced keikhoo) are two twin villages in Manipur, India. They are located at approximately 25 N 94 E. 2 km ESE of Imphal, capital of the state of Manipur. The village in the south is inhabited by the Kabui tribes. The early settlers of the place. The one in the north belongs to a mixed tribe who identifies themselves as "Pangal", a collective term used for Manipuri-Muslims. 

The village lies along the famous hill of Manipur, "Baruni". The hill is frequented as a ritual by the Hindu majority during the Hindu festival of celebrating Shiva. The two villages are geographically divided by a rivulet and marked distinctly by the dialects they speak. 
The Keikhu-Kabuis speak the Kabui Naga language, while the Keikhu-Pangal speaks with an accented Meiteilon.

The two villages of Keikhu belong to under-represented minorities in the state. One belonging to the Schedule Tribe (Kabuis), and the other belonging to Scheduled Caste (Pangals). 

Villages in Imphal East district